Arthur Richards (born 19 June 1890 in Pointe-a-Pitre, Guadeloupe; died 2 December 1972 in Bordeaux) was a French politician who represented the department of Gironde in the French National Assembly from 1958 to 1967.

References

1890 births
1972 deaths
People from Pointe-à-Pitre
Black French politicians
Guadeloupean politicians
Union for the New Republic politicians
Deputies of the 1st National Assembly of the French Fifth Republic
Deputies of the 2nd National Assembly of the French Fifth Republic